Ari Eerik Haanpää (born November 28, 1965 in Nokia, Finland) is a retired professional ice hockey player who played in the National Hockey League with the New York Islanders between 1985 and 1988. The rest of his career, which lasted from 1983 to 1999, and briefly in 2001–2002, was mainly spent in the Finnish SM-liiga. Internationally Haanpää played for the Finnish national junior  team at two European Junior Championships and two World Junior Championships, winning a silver medal in 1984.

Career statistics

Regular season and playoffs

International

External links
 

1965 births
Living people
Calgary Flames scouts
Finnish ice hockey forwards
GEC Nordhorn players
Hockey Club de Reims players
Ilves players
JYP Jyväskylä players
Lukko players
New York Islanders draft picks
New York Islanders players
People from Nokia, Finland
Springfield Indians players
Tappara players
Wiener EV players
Sportspeople from Pirkanmaa